Porina weghiana is a rare species of foliicolous (leaf-dwelling) lichen in the family Porinaceae. Found in the Democratic Republic of the Congo, it was formally described as new to science in 2014 by Dries Van den Broeck, Robert Lücking, and Damien Ertz. It is only known to occur in the type locality. It resembles Porina ornata in appearance but differs in having disc-shaped isidia, yellow perithecia lacking apical appendages, and ascospores that are smaller and have fewer septa. The species epithet is named after the first author's girlfriend, Micheline Wegh.

References

Gyalectales
Lichen species
Lichens of the Democratic Republic of the Congo
Lichens described in 2014
Taxa named by Robert Lücking